The Sager House or Sager Palace (Sagerska palatset) is the official residence of the Prime Minister of Sweden, located at Strömgatan 18 in central Stockholm.

Location 
The Sager House is located in the Stockholm borough of Norrmalm, on the street Strömgatan, on the north side of the Norrström River.

Adjacent landmarks
The Sager House lies between: Rosenbad, the Government Chancellery (on the west); and the Ministry for Foreign Affairs (the former Arvfurstens Palats) and the Royal Swedish Opera on Gustav Adolfs torg (on the east).

It lies across from the Parliament House (Riksdag) building (on the island Helgeandsholmen), and the Royal Palace (on the island Stadsholmen), and is connected with them over the Norrström River through the Riksbron and Norrbro bridges, respectively.

History
The first historical records of a building on the site are from the 1640s. In 1880 the property was purchased by the Sager brothers. The Sager Palace was owned by the Sager family from 1880 to 1986.

In 1988 the building was purchased by the Swedish State to be turned into the official residence of the Prime Minister of Sweden. Before it was bought, there was no official residence in Stockholm for the head of government. The first Prime Minister to use the building after an extensive renovation for its new use was Göran Persson (1996–2006). Fredrik Reinfeldt moved in after the 2006 Swedish general election.

Architecture
In 1893 Robert Sager had the palace remodeled, including the addition of a new floor within a Mansard roof and a French Baroque Revival style facade with Neo-Rococo details, that are still seen.

See also
Architecture of Stockholm
Harpsund Manor — another official residence of the Swedish Prime Minister.

References

External links

Official residences in Sweden
Palaces in Stockholm
Prime ministerial residences
Baroque Revival architecture